Graham Charles Pritchard (14 January 1942 – 26 October 2019) was an English cricketer who played first-class cricket for Cambridge University and Essex from 1962 to 1966.

Pritchard was educated at The King's School, Canterbury, and Gonville and Caius College, Cambridge. He appeared in 35 first-class matches as a right-arm fast-medium bowler and right-handed tail-end batsman. He scored 111 runs at an average of 4.11 with a highest score of 18 and took 56 wickets at an average of 36.75. His best bowling figures were 6 for 51 for Cambridge against Surrey in 1963, when on a damp pitch he moved the ball through the air and off the pitch; at one stage he had three wickets and Surrey were 5 for 4.

References

External links
 
 Graham Pritchard at CricketArchive

1942 births
2019 deaths
People from Farnborough, Hampshire
People educated at The King's School, Canterbury
Alumni of Gonville and Caius College, Cambridge
English cricketers
Essex cricketers
Cambridge University cricketers